General Sir James Abbott,  (12 March 18076 October 1896) was an English military officer in the Bengal Army and an administrator in British India. The city of Abbottabad, in present day Pakistan, was founded by and named after him.

Early life
James Abbott was the third son of  Henry Alexius Abbott, a retired  Calcutta merchant of Blackheath, Kent, and his wife Margaret Welsh, the daughter of William Welsh of Edinburgh. Abbott was educated at a school in Eliot Place, Blackheath and at the East India Company Military Seminary in Addiscombe, Surrey.

A number of his siblings achieved distinction, notably Augustus Abbott, Sir Frederick Abbott, Saunders Alexius Abbott and Keith Edward Abbott.

Early career in India
He was commissioned as a cadet in the Bengal Artillery at the age of sixteen, arriving in India in 1823. He first saw action at the Siege of Bharatpur under the command of his older brother Augustus. In 1827 he was promoted to lieutenant and made adjutant to the Sirhind division of artillery. During this period he saw little action, and between 1835 and 1836 was assigned to the revenue surveys in Gorakhpur and later Bareilly. In June 1838 he was promoted to brevet captain.

The Great Game

In November 1838, Abbott served in the army of Sir John Keane, who had been tasked with supporting Shuja Shah Durrani in his bid to wrest power from Dost Mohammad Khan in Afghanistan. The British had been eager to secure Afghanistan, the gateway to India, in light of increasing Russian influence in Central Asia.

In 1839 the British learned that Russia was planning an invasion of the Khanate of Khiva. In December 1839 acting Captain Abbott was sent from Herat to Khiva in an attempt to negotiate the release of Russian slaves and thereby deny the Russians a pretext for invasion. If war had already broken out, Abbott was instructed to attempt to negotiate a settlement. Abbott reached Khiva in late January, a week or so before the Russians were forced to turn back due to an unusually cold winter. The Khivans knew little of Britain and he was hampered by a lack of understanding of Khivan language and culture. The attempt to release Russian slaves failed.  He did agree with the Khivan ruler, Allah Quli Khan, to establish a British agent in Khiva and to travel to Russia to negotiate between the two powers. He had no authorisation to serve as the Khan's agent, but had no way to communicate with his superiors in India. In March 1840 Abbott set off from Khiva to Fort Alexandrovsk on the Caspian Sea. His caravan was attacked by Kazakhs and he was wounded in the hand and taken hostage, but he and his party were released because the Kazakhs feared British retribution. He reached Saint Petersburg but the attempt at mediation failed. His bravery was recognised through promotion to full Captain.

In May 1840 Lieutenant Richmond Shakespear of the Bengal Artillery went from Herat via Merv to Khiva. He was successful and escorted 416 Russian captives to the Caspian. Shakespear was knighted for this undertaking.

The Paladins of the Punjab
In 1841, Abbott returned from Britain to India. He first held a post with a local battalion in Mewar before becoming assistant to the Resident in Indore in 1842. Following the conclusion of the First Anglo-Sikh War in 1846, Abbott was hand picked to become one of Sir Henry Lawrence's "Young Men", also known as The Paladins of the Punjab. These were East India Company officers sent to act as "advisers" to the Sikh ruler.

Sir Henry Lawrence remarked of him:

As part of the terms of the Treaty of Lahore signed after the defeat of the Sikhs in the First Anglo-Sikh War, Hazara and Kashmir were to be transferred to Raja Gulab Singh; Hazara, however, proved an intractable charge and was returned to the Lahore government by Gulab Singh in January 1847, in exchange for Jammu. Abbott was appointed assistant to Chattar Singh Attariwalla to quell unrest and undertake a survey of revenues. Abbott succeeded in this by learning the language, culture and religion of the local people and promoting their social and economic interests. He made himself popular with Pashtun elders by permitting the call to prayer, which had been banned by the Sikhs.

During the Second Anglo-Sikh War, cut off from all communication with British troops, and dependent upon his own resources, Abbott held the Margalla Hills with a vastly inferior force until the conclusion of the war, a feat for which he was thanked by the Governor-General, The Earl of Dalhousie:

Abbottabad and later life
After the British had annexed the Punjab in the aftermath of the Second Anglo-Sikh War, Abbott was promoted to brevet major and appointed First Deputy Commissioner of Hazara. In 1852, he successfully commanded an expedition to the Black Mountain following the murder of Mr Carne and Mr Tapp, collector and sub-collector of the salt tax by a party of sixty Hussunzyes.

Abbott's original seat of government in the Hazara was at Haripur with Jagirdar of Nara but he eventually decided to shift this up into the hills for climatic and strategic reasons. Thus, a site was selected and acquired in late 1852, and Abbott thereafter shifted his headquarters there in January 1853, founding a small town and military cantonment which was to grow over time. Abbott himself could not long witness the growth of his town, which was later named after him by his colleague Herbert Benjamin Edwardes. In April 1853 he was removed from his post and transferred back to the Bengal Army, where he was placed in charge of a gunpowder factory in Calcutta. His transfer came amid concerns from Lahore over the methods of his governance, fears of divided loyalty, and antagonistic relationships with certain fellow officers.

His last public act as Deputy Commissioner was to invite every person in the district to a party he was holding at Nara Hills. The party lasted three days and nights and was attended by 'a large and lamenting crowd of people'. Abbott reportedly spent all of his savings on the party save for one month's pay. His affection for the local Hazaras was noted by his successor Herbert Edwardes who wrote:

Before he left he also penned an ode to his new settlement:

I remember the day when I first came here
And smelt the sweet Abbottabad air
The trees and ground covered with snow
Gave us indeed a brilliant show
To me the place seemed like a dream
And far ran a lonesome stream
The wind hissed as if welcoming us
The pine swayed creating a lot of fuss
And the tiny cuckoo sang it away
A song very melodious and gay
I adored the place from the first sight
And was happy that my coming here was right
And eight good years here passed very soon
And we leave you perhaps on a sunny noon
Oh Abbottabad we are leaving you now
To your natural beauty do I bow
Perhaps your wind's sound will never reach my ear
My gift for you is a few sad tears
I bid you farewell with a heavy heart
Never from my mind will your memories thwart.

In 1857, Abbott was promoted to lieutenant-colonel, made a Companion of the Order of the Bath on 24 May 1873 and a general on his retirement in 1877. He settled in Ryde on the Isle of Wight in 1890 and was made a Knight Commander on 26 May 1894. He died on the Isle of Wight in 1896. He is buried with his second wife in Guildford, Surrey.

Personal life
Abbott married Margaret Anne Harriet in 1844. She gave birth to their daughter Margaret but died in connection to the birth. He later married Anna Matilda de Montmorency in 1868, who died shortly after having given birth to a son, James Reymond de Montmorency Abbott.

Legacy
The Pakistani city of Abbottabad as well as the district is named after him.

A portrait of James Abbott dressed as an Afghan noble and relating to his Central Asian journey, was painted in watercolour in 1841 by B. Baldwin (see illustration), now in the collection of the National Portrait Gallery in London, though it is not currently on display.

See also
John Nicholson (East India Company officer)

References

External links

British Library website

www.nationalarchives.gov.uk
Zakaria, Fareed. "The man who put Abbott in Abbottabad." CNN. 11 May 2011.

1807 births
1896 deaths
Bengal Artillery officers
City founders
British East India Company Army officers
British Indian Army generals
British military personnel of the First Anglo-Sikh War
British people in colonial India
Great Game
History of Punjab
Knights Commander of the Order of the Bath